William W. Loika (January 1, 1922 – July 31, 1986) was an American football coach.  He was the sixth head football coach at Central Connecticut State University in New Britain, Connecticut, serving 18 seasons, from 1964 to 1981, and compiling a record  of 94–72–3.

Loika graduated from East Hartford High School in East Hartford, Connecticut in 1939.  He then attended St. Benedict's College—now known as Benedictine College—in Atchison, Kansas.  Loika began his coaching career 1947 in Hartford High School in Hartford, Connecticut, where he coached football, basketball, and baseball.  From 1962 to 1963, he was an assistant football coach at the University of Connecticut.  Loika died of cancer on July 31, 1986, at his home in Niantic, Connecticut.

Head coaching record

College

References

1922 births
1986 deaths
Basketball coaches from Connecticut
Central Connecticut Blue Devils football coaches
UConn Huskies football coaches
High school baseball coaches in the United States
High school basketball coaches in Connecticut
High school football coaches in Connecticut
Benedictine College alumni
People from East Hartford, Connecticut
Sportspeople from Norwich, Connecticut
Deaths from cancer in Connecticut